This is a list of people who have served as Lord-Lieutenant of Longford.

There were lieutenants of counties in Ireland until the reign of James II, when they were renamed governors. The office of Lord Lieutenant was recreated on 23 August 1831.

Governors

 George Forbes, 3rd Earl of Granard, 1740–1756 
 George Forbes, 4th Earl of Granard, 1756–   (died 1769) 
 Thomas Gleadowe-Newcomen, 2nd Viscount Newcomen, 1801–1825 
 George Forbes, 6th Earl of Granard, –1831

Lord Lieutenants
 George Forbes, Viscount Forbes, 7 October 1831 – 13 November 1836
 Luke White, 22 November 1836 – 1841
 Henry White, 1st Baron Annaly, 1841 – 3 September 1873
 Luke White, 2nd Baron Annaly, 7 November 1873 – March 1874
 William Pakenham, 4th Earl of Longford, 27 March 1874 – 19 April 1887
 Thomas Pakenham, 5th Earl of Longford, 14 June 1887 – 21 August 1915
 vacant
 Bernard Forbes, 8th Earl of Granard, 26 August 1916 – 1922

References

Longford